Furcraea andina is a species of plant in the family Asparagaceae that is native to South America. The fibres in its leaves, known as fique, are used in making ropes.

References

andina
Flora of the Andes
Flora of Bolivia
Flora of Ecuador
Flora of Peru
Crops originating from South America
Garden plants of South America
Plants described in 1915
Taxa named by William Trelease